Heydarabad (also Romanized as Ḩeydarābād) is a village in Kolyai Rural District, in the Central District of Asadabad County, Hamadan Province, Iran. At the 2006 census, its population was 38, in 10 families.

References 

Populated places in Asadabad County